John Dilloway (christened 4 November 1798; died 1869) was an English cricketer who played for Sussex. He was born in Petworth. He died in 1869 in Kirdford, Sussex.

Dilloway made a single first-class appearance for the team, in 1825, against Hampshire. Batting in the tailend in the same team as his brother, Charles, he scored seven runs in the first innings of the match and two runs in the second innings.

References

External links
John Dilloway at Cricket Archive

1798 births
1869 deaths
English cricketers
Sussex cricketers
People from Petworth
English cricketers of 1787 to 1825
People from Kirdford